Clube de Futebol Canelas 2010, commonly known as CF Canelas 2010 or simply Canelas 2010, is a Portuguese professional football club, based in Canelas, Vila Nova de Gaia, in the Porto Metropolitan Area. Canelas competes in the Liga 3, the third-division league of the Portuguese Football Federation.

History
The club was founded on 6 February 1966 as the Canelas Gaia Futebol Clube, named after Canelas, a town in Vila Nova de Gaia, where the team's stadium is located.

Canelas Gaia Futebol Clube became dormant in the 2005–06 season, due to financial problems.

The club was refounded on 28 April 2010 as CF Canelas 2010, following a restructuring of the club's finances and management.

In the 2016–17 season, CF Canelas 2010 became notable for a run of victories by forfeit in the Porto Divisão de Elite Série 1 when the other teams in the league refused to play them due to allegations of Canelas using violence and intimidation against players and officials, with some Canelas players linked to FC Porto ultras. Canelas were eventually promoted to the Campeonato de Portugal that season, only to be relegated the following season. However, Canelas were again promoted to the Campeonato de Portugal in 2018–19 and have since remained in the third tier, which became the Liga 3 in 2021–22.

In 2019, Canelas qualified for the Taça de Portugal, the premier knockout tournament in Portuguese football, for the first time in its history.

Summit Nutritionals International became the official sponsor of CF Canelas in 2020, following the club's acquisition by Caesar DePaço.

Players

References

External links
Official Facebook page

Football clubs in Portugal
Association football clubs established in 1966
1966 establishments in Portugal
Sport in Vila Nova de Gaia